Chrysocercops thapai is a moth of the family Gracillariidae. It is known from Malaysia and Nepal.

The wingspan is 5.7–7 mm.

The larvae feed on Shorea robusta.

References

Chrysocercops
Moths described in 1992